Meadow Lakes is an unincorporated community in Fresno County, California.

History
The development of Meadow Lakes was first envisioned in the 1920s by Judge Ernest Walling and associates Jean Vincenz and Lloyd Jackson. The Walling led group in 1927 purchased a large property of 1280 acres, a small portion of which was to include their to be named Meadow Lakes subdivision, from Alva Snow and his wife Dora P. Snow.  Later, during the Great Depression, the Snow's again became owners of a portion of the Meadow Lakes subdivision, including various unsold lots, its water system, and surrounding properties.

A post office operated at Meadow Lakes from 1930 to 1933, with a closure for a time in 1932.

References

Unincorporated communities in California
Unincorporated communities in Fresno County, California